Mebarek Soltani (born April 10, 1982) is a boxer from Algeria. He is the nephew of Hocine Soltani.

He participated in the 2000 and 2004 Summer Olympics for his native North African country. In 2000 he was stopped in the first round of the light flyweight (– 48 kg) competition. In 2004 he was stopped in the first round of the flyweight (– 51 kg) division by Russia's Georgy Balakshin.

Soltani won the bronze medal in the same division at the All-Africa Games in Abuja, Nigeria. He qualified for the Athens Games by winning the silver medal at the 1st AIBA African 2004 Olympic Qualifying Tournament in Casablanca, Morocco. In the final of the event he lost to home fighter Hicham Mesbahi.

References
Profile

1982 births
Living people
Light-flyweight boxers
Flyweight boxers
Boxers at the 2000 Summer Olympics
Boxers at the 2004 Summer Olympics
Olympic boxers of Algeria
Algerian male boxers
Mediterranean Games gold medalists for Algeria
Competitors at the 2001 Mediterranean Games
African Games bronze medalists for Algeria
African Games medalists in boxing
Mediterranean Games medalists in boxing
Competitors at the 2003 All-Africa Games
21st-century Algerian people